Bela-Bela (Tswana/Pedi for "the pot that boils"), also known by its original name Warmbaths. is a town in the Limpopo Province of South Africa. Deriving its name from the geothermic hot springs around which the town was built.

The town is situated in the Waterberg District of the Limpopo Province. It lies off the N1 road between Pretoria and Polokwane (Pietersburg).

The main hot springs holiday resort (previously run by state-owned company Aventura, formerly called Overvaal) in the town is still branded Warmbaths.

History 

When the Tswana tribes first moved into the region in about the 1800s, they discovered hot springs in the area.

The Voortrekker Carl Van Heerden established the first farm in what is now Bela-Bela and called it Het Bad. In 1873, President Burgers' Transvaal government bought the land and established a resort called Hartingsburg after the prominent Dutch biologist Pieter Harting. The British occupied the town during the Anglo-Boer War, and renamed the post office Warm Baths in 1903, and proclaimed the boundaries of Warmbaths to be the entire farm of Het Bad.

In 1920 Warmbaths was proclaimed a township (in the legal, not racial sense) and the township was designed by architect John Abraham Moffat in that year. In 1950, it became a magisterial district. In 1932 Warmbaths became a village town and was established as a town council in 1960.

Called Warmbaths in English, the Afrikaans name for the town was Warmbad.

On 14 June 2002 the South African government officially renamed the town to Bela-Bela (meaning "boiling boiling").

Incorrect variations on this spelling can also be sometimes found, such as "Bella Bella" and "Bela Bela".

Climate

See also 
 List of reduplicated place names

References

Populated places founded by Afrikaners
Populated places established in 1873
Populated places in the Bela-Bela Local Municipality
Hot springs of South Africa